A Determinism of Morality is the third full-length album by post-metal band Rosetta. The album was released on May 25, 2010 through Translation Loss Records on CD. "Je N'en Connais Pas La Fin" is translated as "I Do Not Know Its End". The names for the songs "Release", "Revolve" and "Renew" are taken from the lyrics of "Monument", a song from the band's 2007 album Wake/Lift.

Track listing

Personnel
Michael Armine – sound manipulation, vocals
David Grossman – bass guitar
Bruce McMurtrie Jr. – drums
J. Matthew Weed – electric guitar

References

Rosetta (band) albums
2010 albums